Winston Stanley may refer to:

 Winston Stanley (rugby union, born 1974), Canadian rugby union footballer
 Winston Stanley (rugby union, born 1989), Australian-born Samoan rugby union footballer